The Santa Clara County Public Health Department (abbreviated SCCPHD; also known as Santa Clara County Public Health or the County of Santa Clara Public Health Department) is the public health agency for Santa Clara County, California, part of the Santa Clara County Health System. Sara Cody is the current Public Health Director and Health Officer of Santa Clara County.

History
The department was accredited by the Public Health Accreditation Board in March 2016. In 2020, the department was one of the first in the United States to issue a stay-at-home order in response to the COVID-19 pandemic.

References

External links
 

County government agencies in California
Public Health
Health departments in California